Carcassi is a surname. Notable people with the surname include:
 Lorenzo Carcassi (fl. 1700s), Florentine instrument maker
 Matteo Carcassi (1792–1853), Italian guitarist and composer
List of compositions by Matteo Carcassi
 Tomaso Carcassi (fl. 1700s), Florentine instrument maker